Monroe is the largest city and county seat of Monroe County in the U.S. state of Michigan. Monroe had a population of 20,462 in the 2020 census. The city is bordered on the south by Monroe Charter Township, but the two are administered autonomously. Monroe is the core city in the Monroe metropolitan statistical area, which is coterminous with Monroe County and had a population of 154,809 in 2020.

The Monroe area was the scene of several military conflicts during the War of 1812 against the United Kingdom and is known for the Battle of Frenchtown. In 1817, portions of the Frenchtown settlement along the River Raisin were platted and renamed Monroe after then-president James Monroe. When Michigan became a state in 1837, Monroe was incorporated as a city.

Monroe is known as the childhood residence of George Armstrong Custer and other members of his family, including his brother Boston Custer and wife Elizabeth Bacon. Several structures are named after Custer, including Custer Airport. Founded in 1928, the La-Z-Boy world headquarters are located in Monroe.

History

Long occupied by varying cultures of indigenous peoples, the area around the River Raisin was settled by the historic Potawatomi hundreds of years before French explorers and colonists reached it in the late seventeenth century. Robert de LaSalle claimed the area for New France after his 1679 expedition on the Griffon.

In 1784, after the American Revolutionary War, Francis Navarre of Canada was given a portion of land south of the River Raisin by the Potawatomi. Colonists settled Frenchtown shortly thereafter as the third European community in what in the early 19th century became the state of Michigan. Around the same time, the Sandy Creek Settlement was established just north of Frenchtown by French-Canadian Joseph Porlier Benec.

Because of its proximity to Detroit, the area was of strategic importance during the War of 1812 between the United States and Great Britain, especially after Fort Detroit surrendered to the British in August 1812. American forces en route to retake Detroit had camped in the area of the River Raisin in the winter of 1812–13. A force of 200 Native Americans and 63 Canadian militia were forced to retreat north away from the River Raisin by 600 Kentucky militiamen and 100 French, under the command of James Winchester, on January 18, 1813. This skirmish was later dubbed the 'First Battle of the River Raisin'.

But, on January 22, 1813, a force of 800 Native Americans and 597 British, under Henry Proctor, surprised the force of 1,000 Americans and captured Frenchtown. Many of the American militia were inexperienced, ill-trained, and badly equipped. They suffered 397 killed and 547 captured. The British and their allies had only slight losses.

When the British departed with their captives to Detroit, they left those Americans too wounded to walk in the homes of Frenchtown inhabitants under the guard of a small British detachment and Native American allies, including Potawatomi. The morning after the battle, other Native Americans returned to Frenchtown. They plundered and burned homes, and killed and ritually scalped many of the remaining American captives, taking others as slaves. The official U.S. estimate of casualties in this aftermath include a dozen named individuals killed and up to 30 more who were likely killed. The British estimated six Americans were killed.

This event became known throughout the United States as the "River Raisin Massacre". This was also known as the Battle of Frenchtown (or the Second Battle of the River Raisin). Today, the site of the battle is preserved as the River Raisin National Battlefield Park, authorized in 2009. It is the first and so far the only national battlefield established for a War of 1812 site. It has a small visitor center.

The area of Frenchtown was renamed after the War of 1812 and incorporated as the village of Monroe in honor of President James Monroe. He visited the Michigan Territory in 1817. In the same year, the city of Monroe was named as the county seat of the newly created Monroe County. Monroe was re-incorporated as a city in 1837.

Settled mostly by American migrants from New York and New England, Monroe later became associated with events in the West in the later 19th century, particularly the Indian Wars. It is known as the childhood home of George Armstrong Custer (1839–1876), who had a military career in which he reached the rank of major general. His family moved here when he was young, and he lived in Monroe for much of his childhood. Here he later met and in 1864 married Elizabeth Bacon (1842–1933), during the Civil War. In the later 19th century, he led troops in the Indian Wars and died at the Battle of the Little Bighorn, in which his forces were killed by the Lakota. They call it the Battle of the Greasy Grass.

In 1910, President William Howard Taft and the widow Elizabeth Bacon Custer unveiled an equestrian statue of Custer, which now stands at the corner of Elm Avenue and Monroe Street. Custer is also honored in street names, various historic markers, buildings, schools, and the regional Custer Airport. City limit signs for Monroe describe the city as "the home of General Custer."

The La-Z-Boy furniture company, which became known for its reclining easy chairs, was founded in Monroe in 1927. Their world headquarters are located in Monroe, south of the intersection of La-Z-Boy Blvd and Stewart Road. This new facility is roughly 1/2 a mile east of the original location on Telegraph Road; the old building was demolished in 2021 and the site is being redeveloped.

In 1974, the Monroe Power Plant opened. It is the third largest coal fired plant in the United States, with a capacity of 3,280 megawatts.

In December 1989, a combination of Zebra Mussels and ice clogged the sole intake pipe of the Monroe water treatment plant, forcing a two-day shutdown of the city's schools, industries, and businesses.

Geography
The Port of Monroe is the only Michigan port on Lake Erie, and Sterling State Park is the only of Michigan's 103 state parks located on or near Lake Erie. The River Raisin and Sandy Creek travel through Monroe; they are non-navigable because of the several dams and other obstructions.

Climate
Monroe lies in the humid continental climate zone. Monroe does not normally have extremely hot or cold temperatures, as its climate is moderated by the lake. On average, the temperature only drops below  a couple of times during a winter season, and it is even rarer for the temperature to rise above  during the summer.

Demographics

2010 census
As of the census of 2010, there were 20,733 people, 8,238 households, and 5,277 families residing in the city. The racial makeup of the city was 88.4% White, 6.2% African American, 0.4% Native American, 0.7% Asian, 1.2% from other races, and 3.0% from two or more races. Hispanic or Latino of any race were 4.1% of the population.

There were 8,238 households, of which 34.7% had children under the age of 18 living with them, 41.7% were married couples living together, 17.1% had a female householder with no husband present, 5.3% had a male householder with no wife present, and 35.9% were non-families. 30.6% of all households were made up of individuals, and 10.9% had someone living alone who was 65 years of age or older. The average household size was 2.44 and the average family size was 3.05.

The median age in the city was 36.3 years. 26.2% of residents were under the age of 18; 9% were between the ages of 18 and 24; 25.9% were from 25 to 44; 25.4% were from 45 to 64; and 13.3% were 65 years of age or older. The gender makeup of the city was 47.0% male and 53.0% female.

2000 census
In the census of 2000, there were 22,076 people, 8,594 households, and 5,586 families in the city. The racial makeup was 90.87% White, 5.07% African American, 0.24% Native American, 0.84% Asian, 0.02% Pacific Islander, 0.90% from other races, and 2.06% from two or more races. Hispanic or Latino of any race were 2.76% of the population.

There were 8,594 households, of which 33.6% had children under 18 living with them, 46.6% were married couples living together, 14.3% had a female householder with no husband present, and 35.0% were non-families. 30.7% of all households were made up of individuals, and 12.7% had someone living alone 65 years or older. The average household size was 2.47 and the average family size 3.10.

In the city, the population was 26.9% under 18, 8.7% from 18 to 24, 29.3% from 25 to 44, 20.1% from 45 to 64, and 15.0% who 65 or older. The median age was 35 years. For every 100 females, there were 90.2 males. For every 100 females age 18 and over, there were 85.2 males.

The median income for a household in the city was $41,810, and the median income for a family $51,442. Males had a median income of $42,881 versus $25,816 for females. The per capita income for the city was $19,948. 9.0% of families and 12.6% of the population were below the poverty line, including 15.0% of those under 18 and 16.1% of those 65 or over.

Economy

Top employers
According to the city's 2010 Comprehensive Annual Financial Report, the top employers in the city are:

Sports
Monroe is the hometown of the Southern Michigan Timberwolves, a semi-professional football team that competes in the Great Lakes Football League. The Timberwolves have won their league championship four times, three in the Mid-Continental Football League (1996, 97 & 99) and the Minor League Football Alliance championship in 2016.

Education

The city of Monroe is served by one public school district, Monroe Public Schools (MPS), which enrolls approximately 6,700 students. MPS operates five elementary schools, one middle school, one high school, one alternative high school, and two specialized education centers. At around 2,100 students, Monroe High School is one of the largest high schools in the state. Monroe is also served by the Monroe County Intermediate School District, which provides services to other schools in the form of special education services, support staff, substitute teachers, and educational technology (such as computers and distance learning). Students in Monroe may also attend one of two public charter schools.

More than a dozen various parochial schools operate in and around Monroe. In 2012, the three largest parochial elementary schools (St. Michael the Archangel, St. Mary, and St. John the Baptist) merged to form Monroe Catholic Elementary Schools, serving infants through 8th grade. The St. Michael Campus serves infants through 1st grade, while St. John serves 2nd through 4th grade, and St. Mary functions as the Middle School for grades 5 through 8. The largest of the parochial schools is St. Mary Catholic Central High School, which enrolls more than 400 students annually. It has a full sports program that competes against the other public school districts. Zion Lutheran School is a grade school (Pre-K-8) of the Wisconsin Evangelical Lutheran Synod in Monroe. Parents may also homeschool their children.

Marygrove College, sponsored by the local Sisters, Servants of the Immaculate Heart of Mary (IHM), was founded in Monroe in 1905 as a Catholic, liberal arts college. The college moved to Detroit in 1927. The IHM also operated a boarding school, the Hall of the Divine Child, in Monroe from 1918 to 1980. Monroe County Community College was founded in 1964 just west of Monroe. It is the only higher education facility in Monroe County.

Media

The Monroe News is the daily newspaper in Monroe, reporting on all of Monroe County. The newspaper was founded in 1825 and for many years known as The Monroe Evening News. It was purchased by GateHouse Media in fall 2015, prior to which time The Monroe News had about 20 years of employee ownership.

Nielsen puts Monroe in the Detroit DMA but stations from Toledo also cover Monroe County and consider it as a part of their coverage area of northwest Ohio and southeast Michigan. Only in Monroe is a monthly public-access television program covering news on the Monroe area. It is hosted by Kaye Lani Rae Rafko and Michelle Bowman. Comedian and nationally known talk show host Stephen Colbert was a guest host of the show on July 1, 2015. Colbert interviewed musician Eminem. "Only in Monroe" and other public access programming can be found on Monroe Public Access Cable Television.

Rewind 94.3 WERW is the low-power educational FM frequency in Monroe, the station at one time belonged to Monroe Public Schools and is currently run by Monroe Public Access Cable Television. Monroe County Radio is an Internet radio station founded in fall 2012, the studio is in Monroe with news and sports coverage focusing on Monroe County. Nash Icon WMIM 98.3 is the Cumulus radio station in the area, the studio is in downtown Monroe. The current music format is country. Prior to Cumulus owning the station, it was locally owned. Radio stations from Detroit and Toledo are also receivable.

Transportation

Highway and bus

The city of Monroe is served by the Lake Erie Transit public transportation bus system. Established in 1975, Lake Erie Transit currently has a fleet of 31 buses and serves approximately 400,000 riders every year. In 2008, the system logged 764,000 miles. The system operates buses on eight fixed routes in and around the city of Monroe. It also serves several neighboring townships outside of its normal routes should a passenger call ahead for a ride. From Bedford Township, its provides transportation to and from two shopping malls in Toledo, Ohio.

 travels through Monroe and provides access to Toledo and Detroit. There are five interchanges in and near Monroe: LaPlaisance Road (exit 11), Front Street (exit 13), Elm Street (exit 14), North Dixie Highway (exit 15), and Nadeau Road (exit 18).
 has its southern terminus just north of Monroe. Splitting off from I-75, I-275 is a western bypass around Detroit but does not actually merge back with I-75. Aside from I-75, the highway can be accessed near Monroe by US 24 (Telegraph Road) via exit 2.
 terminates in Monroe at US 24 and provides a direct route to Dundee, Jackson, and further. In Monroe, M-50 is known locally as South Custer Road. Its former terminus used to be I-75 at exit 15.
 travels through Monroe and provides access to Toledo and western portions of Detroit. The road is known locally as North Telegraph and South Telegraph — divided at the River Raisin. US 24 also connects to I-275 just north of Monroe.
 travels directly through the downtown area before merging into US 24 north of Monroe. South of downtown after Jones Avenue, it is called South Dixie Highway. In the downtown area, it is South Monroe Street. North of the River Raisin, it is North Monroe Street.
 was a state highway existing from 1930 until 1955 and ran along the northern banks of the River Raisin. In 1955, control of the highway was transferred back to the county. Today, it is called North Custer Road.
 Dixie Highway ran through Monroe in as early as 1915. It was originally one of the few ways to reach places like Florida, but the highway was largely replaced by I-75 beginning in the 1960s. Today, the namesake of the highway is used for two non-connecting highways (one being M-125), although the same route and remnants of the original highway are long gone.
 was the designated name for the portion of Dixie Highway north of Cincinnati, including the portion running through Monroe. Like Dixie Highway, US 25 was largely replaced, and the existing highway was truncated at Cincinnati.
 Custer Airport was built in 1946 and is located on the former M-130. It is a very small and seldom used airport. There are no commercial or passenger flights departing from or arriving at Custer Airport. There is one paved runway used by small personal airplanes. There is also a small aviation school on the site. All air services in the area are primarily through the Metro Airport in Wayne County.

Railroads
Present day freight hauling railroads operating through and around Monroe are the Norfolk Southern, CSX, and the Canadian National. Historic railroads operating until the 1950s–60s were the Pere Marquette, Ann Arbor, Wabash, Grand Trunk Western, and the Detroit, Toledo, and Ironton. The Baltimore and Ohio had trackage rights with the PM and the Wabash upon which to operate its Detroit to Toledo passenger trains such as the Ambassador which after Toledo continued to Washington, D.C. and from there northward to Baltimore, Philadelphia, and New York City.

Interurbans
From 1900 to the 1930s, the electric Detroit United Railway (eventually becoming the Eastern Michigan Ry) operated hourly interurban passenger service between Detroit and Toledo through Monroe. The DU/EM provided valuable and frequent passenger transportation plus carryed freight at a time of unpaved and unreliable roads. The gradual business lost as Michigan and Ohio and their towns paved highways in the 1920s and resulting growing truck and automobile use, plus the 1930–32 dramatic loss of business caused by the economic impact of the Great Depression shut the interurban down in 1932. The Eastern Michigan had carried considerable freight and passengers from Detroit to Cleveland exchanged with the Lake Shore Electric interurban at Toledo. Similarly, it had carried freight and passengers from Detroit to Dayton, Columbus, and Cincinnati exchanged with the Cincinnati and Lake Erie interurban at Toledo.

Notable people

Rance Allen (1948-2020), Bishop, songwriter, gospel singer
Alfred E. Bates, U.S. Army major general
Frankie Biggz (b. Francisco Andres Lucio, 1973), record producer, singer-songwriter, musician, and DJ
Vic Braden (1929–2014), tennis champion and coach
Christie Brinkley (b. 1954), model, born in Monroe
Robert K. Brown (b. 1932), combat correspondent, investigative journalist, and founder, editor, publisher of Soldier of Fortune magazine
Horace Thompson Carpenter (1857–1947), artist and art critic, historian
Isaac P. Christiancy (1812–1890), Chief Justice of the Michigan Supreme Court
Ken W. Clawson (1936–1999), deputy director of Communications for President Richard Nixon during Watergate scandal
Audie Cole (b. 1989), football player for Minnesota Vikings
Oliver H. P. Cowdery (1806–1850), important figure in founding of Latter Day Saint movement, lived in Monroe
Boston Custer (1848–1876), younger brother of General George Custer, lived in Monroe, killed at Battle of Little Big Horn
Elizabeth Bacon Custer (1842–1933), wife of General Custer, born in Monroe
George Armstrong Custer (1839–1876), iconic 19th Century soldier, lived much of his early life in Monroe
Eric Daman (b. 1970), fashion designer
Robert S. Duncanson (1821–1872), first professional African-American artist
Elisha Peyre Ferry (1825–1895), first governor of state of Washington
Carl Ford (b. 1980), football player
Don Gonyea (b. 1956), White House correspondent for National Public Radio
John James Hattstaedt, musician, founder and president of American Conservatory of Music in Chicago (1886–1991), was born and grew up in Monroe
Valerie Harper (1939–2019), actress, star of sitcoms The Mary Tyler Moore Show, Rhoda and Valerie, grew up in Monroe
Ernest Ingersoll (1852–1946), environmentalist and writer.
Mary Harris "Mother" Jones (1837–1930), union organizer, lived in Monroe
Ken Kelley (1949–2008), journalist, editor, and publisher
Ernst G. W. Keyl (1804–1872), Lutheran clergyman, died in Monroe
Tonya Kinzinger, actress, born in Monroe
Karen Koch (b. 1951), world's first professional female ice hockey player
Charles Lanman (1819–1895), author, artist and US government official
Robert McClelland (1807–1880), prominent Michigan politician
Bronco McKart (b. 1971), prizefighter, World Boxing Organization champion
J. Sterling Morton (1832–1902), prominent conservationist, lived in Monroe from 1834 to 1854
Fannie Ellsworth Newberry (1848–1942), writer of girls' stories, born in Monroe
Kaye Lani Rae Rafko (b. 1963), Miss America 1988
Henry Armstrong Reed (1858–1876), nephew of George Custer, lived in Monroe, killed at Little Big Horn
James A. Roy, 16th Chief Master Sergeant of the Air Force
Paul W. Smith, WJR radio personality
Vern Sneider (1916–1981), novelist who wrote Teahouse of the August Moon
George Spalding, U.S. Congressman
Matt Urban (1919–1995), most decorated combat soldier of WWII
Frankie E. Harris Wassom (1850–1933), educator and poet
Todd Williams (b. 1969), two-time U.S. Olympian at 10,000m (1992, 1996)
Eric Wilson (b. 1978), football player
Warner Wing (1805–1876), Michigan jurist and legislator

Sister cities
Monroe, Michigan has only one official sister city:
 Hofu, Japan, since 1993

See also

References

External links

City of Monroe official website
The Monroe News
 
 

 
Cities in Monroe County, Michigan
County seats in Michigan
Michigan populated places on Lake Erie
Metro Detroit
Michigan in the War of 1812
1817 establishments in Michigan Territory
Populated places established in 1817